An inclusion rider or equity rider is a provision in an actor's or filmmaker's contract that provides for a certain level of diversity in casting and production staff. For example, the rider might require a certain proportion of actors or staff to be women, people of color, LGBT people or people with disabilities. Prominent actors or filmmakers may use their negotiating power to insist on such provisions. The term is derived from the "rider", a provision in the contract of performing actors to ensure certain aspects of a performance such as personal amenities or technical infrastructure.

History
The idea was developed by Stacy L. Smith, professor at the USC Annenberg School for Communication and Journalism, in a 2014 op-ed for The Hollywood Reporter and in her 2016 TED talk. Together with the film executive Fanshen Cox DiGiovanni and the employment attorney Kalpana Kotagal Smith created a template for an inclusion rider.

Inclusion riders became more widely known at the 2018 Academy Awards, when actress Frances McDormand said at the end of her Best Actress acceptance speech, "I have two words to leave with you tonight, ladies and gentlemen: inclusion rider!" McDormand had learned about inclusion riders only the week before the awards ceremony.

Still, in June 2019, the New York Times reported that inclusion riders remained rarely used, even though studios pursued other diversity policies. In March 2018, Netflix CEO Reed Hastings declined to adopt an inclusion rider for Netflix productions.

Use
The following persons or institutions have committed to using inclusion riders or inclusion policies:

Filmmakers 
Ben Affleck 
Matt Damon
Paul Feig 
Michael B. Jordan
Brie Larson

Talent agencies
William Morris Endeavor

Entertainment companies
Warner Bros. Discovery: The first film made with an inclusion rider is Just Mercy (2019).

References

External links
 Inclusion rider template on the Annenberg Inclusion Initiative website

Contract law
Acting